Bell Media Radio, G.P. (formerly CHUM Radio), operating as iHeartRadio Canada, is the radio broadcasting and music events subsidiary of Canadian media conglomerate Bell Media. The company has its origins in CHUM Limited, which was acquired by CTVglobemedia in 2006. Through subsequent acquisitions, it also subsumed the radio properties of Astral Media in 2013; many of these were former Standard Radio stations that were acquired by Astral in 2007. 

In 2016, Bell Media reached a licensing agreement with U.S. radio conglomerate iHeartMedia to operate a localized version of its internet radio platform iHeartRadio, and organize Canadian versions of its event franchises (such as the Jingle Ball). Since this agreement, Bell has primarily promoted its audio content, including radio stations and podcasts, under the public-facing brand iHeartRadio Canada.

Bell Media currently owns over 100 radio stations across Canada, including most of Canada's largest radio markets. The company's programming is distributed to other stations across Canada via its syndication division, Orbyt Media, and it is also the local licensee of the Virgin Radio brand.

Operations

As of August 2009, its head office is currently located at 250 Richmond Street West in Toronto, where the studios of its Toronto flagship stations CHUM-FM, CKFM-FM, CFRB and CHUM (AM) are located. The stations moved from their historic location, 1331 Yonge Street, after the property was sold to Aspen Ridge Homes for $21.5 million.

CHUM Radio also previously operated CHUM Satellite Services, a multimedia division which provided programming and production services for corporate clients. This operation was acquired in 2009 by Stingray Digital, which eventually renamed it Stingray360.

On January 6, 2016, iHeartMedia announced that Bell Media would enter into a licensing deal to launch a Canadian version of its radio streaming service iHeartRadio. Bell will handle Canadian licensing, marketing, and distribution of the service, contribute its content to the venture, and also gain rights to produce iHeartRadio-branded events. The service launched in October 2016.

Since then, Bell has downplayed the branding  "Bell Media Radio" in reference to its stations, and has referred to the collective platform, including the terrestrial stations, online outlets (which were all consolidated under iHeartRadio.ca) and podcasts from Bell Media properties that are distributed under the platform, under the name iHeartRadio Canada. The MuchMusic Video Awards were also re-branded as the iHeartRadio MMVAs.

Programming
Bell's stations broadcast under various formats, although hot adult contemporary and adult hits are particularly common. The stations typically air locally produced or voice-tracked programming for the majority of their schedules, although some national network programming also airs. In 2007 and part of 2008, the hot adult contemporary radio stations also aired the national evening program The Sound Lounge. Bell distributes The Breakfast Club, The Bobby Bones Show, Brooke & Jeffrey, On Air with Ryan Seacrest, and the American Top 40 in Canada via Orbyt Media.

As of 2021, the majority of Bell Media's music radio stations operate under standard, networked formats with a mix of local and/or common national programming. These brands include. 

 Bounce: Adult hits stations. 25 stations adopted the branding upon its launch on May 18, 2021, with the largest being Winnipeg's CFWM-FM and Hamilton's CKLH-FM; the majority of the stations that flipped included adult contemporary, hot adult contemporary, active rock, adult hits, and classic hits stations, including all remaining Bob FM and EZ Rock-branded stations operated by the company.
 Move: Adult contemporary and hot adult contemporary stations. 10 stations adopted the branding upon its launch on December 27, 2020, including CHQM-FM, CJMJ-FM, and CIOO-FM.
 Pure Country: Country stations. 13 stations adopted the branding upon its launch on May 28, 2019, including 12 existing stations and newly flipped CKLC-FM in Kingston. All stations carry a midday show hosted by Shannon Ella, and The Bobby Bones Show.
 Virgin Radio: CHR/Top 40 stations, using branding licensed from the Virgin Group. The brand was first introduced by Astral Media's CKFM-FM in 2008.

Bell's French-language radio stations in Quebec, inherited from Astral Media, have similarly operated using networked formats:

 Énergie: Mainstream rock stations. 
 Rouge FM: Adult contemporary stations.
Bell also operates three networked brands featuring talk and spoken word programming, Except for TSN Radio (which features a mix of local programming and other acquired sports talk programs and event broadcasts, often syndicated from ESPN Radio and Westwood One Sports), the majority of this programming is automated with little local content:

 BNN Bloomberg Radio: Business news stations, which feature programming from Bloomberg Radio and audio simulcasts of programs from the BNN Bloomberg television channel.
 Funny: Carries stand-up comedy. Was initially a Canadian licensee of the U.S. radio network 24/7 Comedy.
 TSN Radio: Sports talk stations, co-branded with Bell's TSN sports channel. Three of the TSN Radio stations were formerly part of a larger but short-lived national sports radio network known as The Team, which was launched by CHUM Limited in 2001 on virtually all of the company's AM radio stations across Canada, but was dissolved in 2002 due to poor ratings. The stations that did not remain AM sports radio stations are either oldies or news/talk formats.

Bell began to introduce in-house evening programming for its news/talk stations in 2017 with The Evan Solomon Show. In 2020, amid the COVID-19 pandemic, Bell dropped Coast to Coast AM from its stations and replaced it with The Late Shift with Jason Agnew, later replaced in 2021 by the new overnight show The Late Showgram with Jim Richards.

From its ownership of Astral Media, Bell also owns the Boom FM and EZ Rock brands. Presently Boom FM is used only by two Bell-owned stations, both in Quebec; the majority of English-language stations using the brand are owned by Stingray Radio (who had acquired the flagship outlet in Toronto, CHBM-FM as part of divestments mandated during Bell's purchase of Astral). The last remaining EZ Rock-branded stations in Canada were phased out with the launch of the Bounce and Move brands.

Stations

See also
Virgin Radio

References

External links

Bell Media
Radio broadcasting companies of Canada